Hamisa binti Samat is a Malaysian politician who has been the Assistant State Minister. She served as the Member of Sabah State Legislative Assembly (MLA) for Tanjong Batu from March 2004 until September 2020. He was a member of the United Malays National Organisation (UMNO) which is aligned with the ruling Perikatan Nasional (PN) coalition both in federal and state levels.

Election results

Honours
  :
  Commander of the Order of Kinabalu (PGDK) – Datuk (2006)

References

Malaysian politicians
Living people
Year of birth missing (living people)
Commanders of the Order of Kinabalu
Former United Malays National Organisation politicians
Sabah Heritage Party politicians